The American Junior Academy of Sciences (AJAS) is the only US honor society recognizing America's premier high school students for outstanding scientific research.   Each state's Academy of Science nominates high school students as AJAS delegates.  The chosen delegates are then invited to attend the AJAS annual conference.  The AJAS mission is to introduce, encourage, and accelerate pre-college students into the professional world of science, technology, engineering, and mathematics.

Each state's Academy of Science determines the guidelines by which their AJAS delegates are chosen. In many cases, the Academy of Science organizes a Junior Academy of Science. Under the direction of the Junior Academy, a statewide scientific research competition is held. The winners of these competitions are nominated to represent their state at the AJAS conference. Interested students and mentors should contact their state Academy of Science for information on how to get involved.

AJAS meets annually in conjunction with the American Association for the Advancement of Science’s (AAAS) annual meeting.  AAAS is the largest scientific organization in the world and the publisher of Science. AAAS serves as an authoritative source for information on the latest developments in science and bridges gaps among scientists, policy-makers and the public to advance science and science education.   During the conference, AJAS delegates tour local institutions of scientific importance, share their research with their peers and with other scientists, attend conference sessions, and are inducted as lifetime Fellows into the American Junior Academy of Science.

AJAS is a program of the National Association of the Academics of Science (NAAS). 
NAAS is the national organization for the state science academies and is an affiliate member of AAAS.

External links
http://www.academiesofscience.org/
http://www.aaas.org/page/national-association-academies-science/
listen to Podcast about the AJAS
https://web.archive.org/web/20150203011253/http://podcasts.aaas.org/science_podcast/SciencePodcast_120220b.mp3
AJAS visits MIT
http://newsoffice.mit.edu/2013/mit-hosts-american-junior-academy-of-science-delegates/
AJAS STUDENTS VIDEO PRESENTATIONS
http://www.academiesofscience.org/34-videos-and-podcasts/
old site
http://www.amjas.org/

Scientific societies based in the United States